Kambar (Kazakh: Камбар) is a name coming from the Kazakh language. The name means "great power".

Famous people 

 Kambar batyr, was one of the great heroes of ancient Kazakhstan.

Kazakh masculine given names

References